Passover is a festival in Samaritanism.

Samaritans make a pilgrimage to Mount Gerizim in the West Bank, with men participating in public worship.

Samaritan Passovers are each one day long, followed by the six-day Festival of Unleavened Bread – for a total of seven days. that includes the ancient lamb sacrifice on Mount Gerizim on the 7th day.

References

Samaritan culture and history
Spring (season) events in Israel